Jazmine Marie Sullivan (born April 9, 1987) is an American R&B and soul singer. Born and raised in Philadelphia, her debut album, Fearless was released in 2008. The record topped Billboard's Top R&B/Hip-Hop Albums chart and was certified platinum by the Recording Industry Association of America (RIAA). It spawned four singles, including "Need U Bad" and "Bust Your Windows", both of which were in the top 40 of the Billboard Hot 100 chart; the former became Sullivan's first and only number one on the Billboard Hot R&B/Hip-Hop Songs chart.

Sullivan followed this with her second studio album, Love Me Back, in 2010, which was received favorably by critics. After taking a three-year break, Sullivan signed with RCA Records and released her first studio album under the label, Reality Show, in 2015, and it became her second album to peak at number one on the Top R&B/Hip-Hop Albums chart. In 2021, she released her critically acclaimed EP, Heaux Tales which has the single "Pick Up Your Feelings".

Sullivan has received two Grammy Awards, a Billboard Women in Music Award, two Soul Train Music Awards, three NAACP Image Awards, and two BET Awards over the course of her career. In 2022, Time placed her on their list of the 100 Most Influential People.

Life and career

1987–2006: Early life 
Jazmine Sullivan's parents are Don and Pam Sullivan. Her mother is a former backup singer for Philadelphia International Records. When she was five years old, her father landed a position as a curator for the city's Historic Strawberry Mansion in the Strawberry Mansion section of Philadelphia, and her family moved into the historical landmark.

Sullivan is a 2005 graduate of the Philadelphia High School for the Creative and Performing Arts where she was a vocal music major. Sullivan began singing as a contralto in the children's choir, and later in the adult choir. Sullivan's exposure to secular music was initially limited.

2003–2009: Beginning of career 

At fifteen, Sullivan signed to Jive Records. She recorded an album, which was never released and she was eventually dropped from the label. Sullivan provided vocals for Kindred the Family Soul's song, "I Am", as well as background vocals on the song "Party's Over", and the title track to their 2003 debut Surrender to Love. She first met rapper Missy Elliott during the session;  Elliott went on to produce both the majority of her debut album, Fearless and tracks on Love Me Back. Sullivan wrote and recorded with producers Cool & Dre a song titled "Say I" with producers Cool & Dre; it was given to Dre's then-girlfriend Christina Milian for her third album, So Amazin'. The song became the lead single, peaking at number 13 on the Hot R&B/Hip-Hop Songs as well as reaching number 21 on the Hot 100 chart. Sullivan's breakthrough song, "Need U Bad" was released in May 2008. The song featured additional vocals by Missy Elliott and Sandy "Pepa" Denton of Salt-n-Pepa, later debuted at number 37 on the Billboard Hot 100 and was on top of the Hot R&B/Hip Hop Songs for 34 weeks.

Sullivan's debut album Fearless was released on September 23, 2008. At the time, she wrote and composed many of its songs and served as the album's executive producer alongside Missy Elliott, Salaam Remi, and Peter Edge. The album received production from Elliott, Remi, Stargate, Carvin & Ivan, Jack Splash, and Fisticuffs. Fearless debuted at number 1 on the Top R&B/Hip Hop Albums and at number 6 on the Billboard 200. Sullivan followed her début single with the release of the second single from Fearless, "Bust Your Windows", which reached number 4 on the Hot R&B/Hip-Hop Songs and number 31 on the Billboard Hot 100, becoming her most successful single on that chart to date. "Bust Your Windows" appeared on the first season of the Fox hit television show Glee and was also nominated for a Grammy for Best R&B Song. In 2014, Stevie Wonder claimed he considered "Bust Your Windows" a classic song. "Lions, Tigers & Bears" was released as the album's third single in December 2008. It scored her third consecutive top ten on the Hot R&B/Hip-Hop Songs, reaching number 10, and garnered some mainstream success by reaching number 74 on the Billboard Hot 100. Sullivan later pursued success in the United Kingdom and she first released "Dream Big" as a single in the UK in February 2009. The song was released as the fourth and final single from the album in April 2009. The album has a platinum certification by the Recording Industry Association of America and has sold more than 510,000 copies in the United States.

Sullivan was featured on a song entitled "Smoking Gun" with Jadakiss on his third studio album The Last Kiss. The song was influenced by a family friend, Devonte Wongwai, from New York City, who wanted to hear the duo on a record. She was also a supporting act for fellow American R&B singer Maxwell on his 2008 US tour and was the opening act for Ne-Yo's 2009 Year of the Gentleman Tour. She additionally appeared on Ace Hood's second studio album, Ruthless, on the song "Champion". She went on to headline a few dates with Ryan Leslie, before participating in the Essence Music Festival in June 2009. In the same year Sullivan appeared in commercials for Cotton Incorporated. Additionally Sullivan made a guest appearance on Snoop Dogg's tenth studio album Malice n Wonderland on the song "Different Languages".

2010-2011: Love Me Back
Sullivan began working on her second album, Love Me Back, in 2009. Producers contributing to the album included Missy Elliott, Lamb, Ne-Yo, Anthony Bell, Los da Mystro, Ryan Leslie, and Salaam Remi, who was also a major contributor to Fearless. Songs recorded for the album include "Love You Long Time", "Don't Make Me Wait" (a tribute to Prince), "Redemption", "Excuse Me", "Good Enough", and the reported sequel to "Bust Your Windows" titled "You Get On My Nerves", which was co-written by Ne-Yo. The album was completed in June 2010 and released on November 30, 2010. The album debuted at number 17 on the Billboard 200 and sold 57,000 copies in its first week.

In an interview with National Public Radio Sullivan explained that the album was about her personal experiences, stating:

The album's lead single, "Holding You Down (Goin' in Circles)", was released on July 10, 2010. The song debuted at number 60 on the Billboard Hot 100. The music video for the song premiered on August 30, 2010. The song would later be nominated for a Grammy Award for Best Female R&B Vocal Performance in 2011. The album's second single, "10 Seconds", was released to radio airplay in late September, and debuted at number 15 the Hot R&B/Hip-Hop Songs. The song was later released for digital download on October 25, 2010. An accompanying music video was later filmed and was released on November 12, 2010.

In early December 2010, Billboard honoured Sullivan as the 'Rising Star' for 2010. Later she announced that she was working on her third studio album. In January 2011, Sullivan announced via Twitter that she was indefinitely leaving the music industry saying, "I promised myself when it wasn't fun anymore I wouldn't do it. And, here I am. I'm not saying I won't ever sing again in my life because I don't believe that. But in this moment… right now… [I] got some things to figure out". On October 7, RCA Records announced it was disbanding J Records along with Arista Records and Jive Records. With the shutdown Sullivan (along with all of the artists previously signed to the three labels) were removed from the label and later redirected to RCA; all being moved to that label's roster.

2014–2019: Return to music and Reality Show 
In 2014, Sullivan returned to music with the announcement of her new album, Reality Show. In an interview with Billboard, Sullivan described her return as inevitable saying she "...can't escape [her] calling". She based her song Reality Show on watching reality shows during her hiatus which inspired the namesake. The album consists of 14 songs, and features production from Key Wane and Salaam Remi. The lead single "Dumb" featuring American rapper Meek Mill, was released on May 12, 2014. The song debuted at number 45 on the R&B/Hip-Hop Airplay. The second single "Forever Don't Last" was released on September 16, 2014. It peaked at number 10 on the Adult R&B Songs chart.

On January 13, 2015, Jazmine Sullivan released Reality Show to widespread critical acclaim, with the album reaching number one on the Billboard R&B Albums and number two on the Top R&B/Hip-Hop Albums. Reality Show sold 30,000 copies in its first week. Slant Magazine commented, "Despite what the rasp in her voice might suggest, Sullivan clearly sees herself as something other than R&B's next great queen of pain. Her central themes—love and self-image—don't stray far from genre convention, but her musical versatility and keenly observed characters make her one of the most captivating artists in R&B today." The album earned Sullivan three Grammy Award nominations for Best R&B Album and Best Traditional R&B Performance ("Let It Burn").

In 2016, Sullivan was featured in the visual album "Endless" by Frank Ocean. Sullivan lent her vocals to four songs from the album: "Alabama", "Wither", "Hublots", and "Rushes". Sullivan was the lead writer for these four songs on Mary J. Blige's album Strength of a Woman, and sang backup vocals on the first three of them: "Thick of It", "Set Me Free", "Glow Up", and "Thank You." ("Strength of a Woman" album liner notes). She in partnership with fellow American singer Bryson Tiller released "Insecure" for the soundtrack for the second season of the HBO series of the same title. Also in 2016 she performed the national anthem at the first game of the 2016 NHL Stadium Series at TCF Bank Stadium featuring the Chicago Blackhawks and Minnesota Wild. In 2019, Sullivan was featured on Pentatonix's Christmas collection The Best of Pentatonix Christmas on the group's cover of "Joyful, Joyful".

2020–present: Heaux Tales 
In August 2020, Sullivan announced the release of a new song titled "Lost One", marking her return to music. Within hours of the announcement, the phrase "New Jazmine" trended on Twitter across the United States. The song was released the next day along with the confirmation of her extended play (EP), Heaux Tales. Sullivan released the second single "Pick Up Your Feelings" on November 20, 2020. Heaux Tales was released on January 8, 2021. With first-week sales of 42,000 copies the EP debuted at number four on the US Billboard 200 chart and earning Sullivan her highest-peaking album on the chart.

In February 2021, it was announced that Sullivan was nominated for the 52nd NAACP Image Awards, which took place on March 27, 2021. She competed with artists such as Beyoncé, H.E.R., Ledisi, and Alicia Keys for the Outstanding Female Artist category. On February 7, she performed "The Star-Spangled Banner" alongside country artist Eric Church at Super Bowl LV. In May, she earned the first single gold certification of Heaux Tales with "Pick Up Your Feelings".

On June 24, 2021, Sullivan released "Tragic". On June 27, she performed "Tragic" at the 2021 BET Awards along with "On It" (featuring Ari Lennox). She was awarded the BET Award for Album of the Year that night.

In 2023, Rolling Stone ranked Sullivan at number 182 on its list of the 200 Greatest Singers of All Time.

Musical style
Sonically, Sullivan's voice alternates between "modern productions" and a "1980s-influenced sound" which music critics say gives her "old-school hip hop sound". Her voice type is contralto. Her voice has a solid agility in all registers and is well connected between an A2 and a G5. InStyle said that she has a "raspy voice". She describes her writing style as "flashbacks", in reference to her songs about failed relationships that were both physically and emotionally abusive. Her music displays her responses to these relationships famously with her song "Bust Your Windows". She likes to write about how she is feeling, which in turn, taking a day or up to a month to complete. During the recording of the album Reality Show, Sullivan spent so much time revising and re-recording, that the producers had to force her to release the album to prevent a delayed release. Sullivan is well known for writing her own songs which amplifies her substantial popularity from both critics and fans.

Sullivan's song "Bust Your Windows" was listed at number 137 on National Public Radio's list of The 200 Greatest Songs By 21st Century Women.

Personal life
On May 11, 2020, Sullivan announced that her mother Pam had been diagnosed with inflammatory breast cancer in October 2019. In her Instagram post she wrote: "If being your daughter has taught me one thing it is how to work with something ugly, painful even, and make it a work of art".

Discography

 Fearless (2008)
 Love Me Back (2010)
 Reality Show (2015)

Concert tours
Headlining
 The Reality Show Tour (2015)
 The Heaux Tales Tour (2022)

Co-headlining
 Year of the Gentlemen Tour (2009)

Awards and nominations

See also
 List of Billboard number-one R&B albums of 2008
 List of R&B number-one singles of 2008 (U.S.)

Notes

References

External links

 
1987 births
Living people
21st-century American women singers
21st-century American singers
African-American actresses
African-American women singer-songwriters
American contemporary R&B singers
American contraltos
American neo soul singers
American reggae musicians
American women hip hop singers
Grammy Award winners
Musicians from Philadelphia
Philadelphia High School for the Creative and Performing Arts alumni
RCA Records artists
Singer-songwriters from Pennsylvania